Robert Andrew Franklin (born 1965), is a Hillingdon, London-born, Welsh raised, comedian who has lived in Australia since 1989.

Career

Television
On Australian television, Franklin was both writer and performer on Jimeoin (1994–95), Shaun Micallef's World Around Him (1996), Small Tales & True (1998), Eric (1997), The Mick Molloy Show (1999) and Introducing Gary Petty (2000), in which he played the title role and received an Australian Writers' Guild award nomination.

Franklin has also acted in TV dramas such as Kangaroo Palace (1997), Stingers (2002), After the Deluge (2003), CrashBurn (2003), The Heartbreak Tour (2005), Tripping Over (2006) and an episode of The Adventures of Lano and Woodley ("Starquest").

From 2012 to 2021, Franklin had a recurring role as Brendan O'Grady in the Jack Irish films and television series.

Franklin has made several appearances on Thank God You're Here and was in the sitcoms The Librarians, and Stupid Stupid Man.

Franklin starred in Shaun Micallef's TV series Mr & Mrs Murder, Episode 9: The Art of Murder (aired 17 April 2013) as "Jack"; a homeless gentleman with an exquisite eye for class and beauty.  He had a recurring role in the second and third series of Please Like Me, a drama by Australian comedian Josh Thomas.  Franklin also featured as a loan shark in the Australian opera miniseries The Divorce.

Film
Franklin has appeared in several Australian films, including The Craic (1999), You Can't Stop The Murders (2003), Bad Eggs (2003), The Extra (2005), Macbeth (2006), BoyTown (2006)  The Last Confession of Alexander Pearce (2008), Three Blind Mice (2008) and Beneath Hill 60 (2010).

Books
Franklin's first book Under Stones, a collection of 'tales of unease', was published in 2010 by Affirm Press. It won the 2010 Australian Shadows Award for Long Fiction.

His debut novel, Moving Tigers, was published in 2015.

References

External links
 
 Bob Franklin Bio

Comedians from London
Male actors from London
British expatriates in Australia
British male film actors
British male television actors
British stand-up comedians
People from Hillingdon
Living people
1965 births
20th-century British male actors
20th-century British comedians
21st-century British male actors
21st-century British comedians